Mould Bay Airport, formerly , was located on the Prince Patrick Island, Northwest Territories, Canada. It was built in 1948 as a joint effort between Canada and the United States to service the former Environment Canada weather station. The station was automated in 1997 which eliminated the need for an airport; however, as of 2012, the island was still occasionally visited by members of the Canadian Forces.

References

External links
 

Airports in the Arctic
Defunct airports in the Northwest Territories